Paul-Louis-Marie-Célestin, baron de Favereau (15 January 1856 - 26 September 1922) was a Belgian politician and member of the Catholic Party.

Life
Born in Liège, he became a doctor of law before serving as member of the Belgian Parliament for the arrondissement of Marche-en-Famenne (1884-1900). On 16 September 1884 he married Marie-Charlotte Frésart (1864-1947), with whom he had Edith-Paul-Adeline-Marie-Joseph-Ernestine-Elisabeth de Favereau, later wife of Charles-Albert d'Aspremont Lynden and mother of Harold Charles d'Aspremont Lynden.

De Favereau also became Foreign Minister (1896-1907) and senator for the Province of Luxembourg (1900-1922). He was made a minister of state in 1907. For his last eleven years in the senate he also served as its president. He died at the château de Jenneret.

Honours 
 Grand cordon of the Order of Leopold
 Civic Cross, 1st Class
 Commemorative Medal of the Reign of King Leopold II
 Grand Cross of the Order of
 Saints Maurice and Lazarus (Italy)
 the Oak Crown (Luxembourg)
 the Saviour (Greece)
 the Double Dragon (China)
 the Polar Star (Sweden)
 the White Eagle (Poland)
 the Rising Sun (Japan)
 the Villa Vicosa (Portugal)
 the White Elephant (Siam)
 the Lion and the Sun (Persia)
 the Légion d’honneur (France)
 Osmanieh (Turkey)
 Pius IX (Papal States)

References

1856 births
1922 deaths
Belgian Ministers of State
Barons of Belgium
Members of the Senate (Belgium)
Foreign ministers of Belgium
Politicians from Liège
Presidents of the Senate (Belgium)